From 1998 through 2014, MTV aired New Year's Eve specials. Carrying various formats and branding, the specials were typically broadcast from MTV's One Astor Plaza studios in Times Square, and featured concert performances and coverage of the nearby ball drop at midnight. During the late 1990s, 2000s, and part of the early 2010s, the special was heavily promoted and featured top musical acts and celebrities. By its final years, the specials had been downsized in comparison.

The network decided not to carry a special at the end of 2015 leading into 2016, choosing to carry a marathon of the viral clip series Ridiculousness instead, with a teaser of the first segment of the next episode of the network's series Teen Wolf aired at midnight; the network and parent company Viacom in general went through number of staff and budget cutbacks in 2015 due to declining ratings. This was repeated in subsequent years.

1998-1999: MTV New Year's Eve Live. Hosts: Carson Daly and Jennifer Love Hewitt. Performers: Green Day, Method Man, Limp Bizkit (With Everlast during "Jump Around"). House DJ: Kid Rock. Guests: Aaliyah, Katie Holmes, 98°. Correspondents: Ananda Lewis, Jesse Camp, Dave Holmes.
1999-2000: MTV 2|Large Millennium Countdown. Hosts: Carson Daly, Christina Aguilera, Kathy Griffin. Correspondents: DJ Skribble, Tyrese, Chris Connelly, Kurt Loder, Dave Holmes. Performers: Blink-182, No Doubt, Bush, 98°, Christina Aguilera. DJ: Mark Ronson.
2000-2001: New Year's Eve 2001
2001-2002: NYE 02
2002-2003: New Year Pajama Party
2003-2004: MTV's New Year's Eve 2004
2004-2005: Iced Out – New Year's Eve 2005
2005-2006: New Year of Music
2006-2007: MTV Goes Gold – New Year's Eve 2007
2007-2008: Tila Tequila's MTV New Year's Eve Masquerade 2008. Host: Tila Tequila. Co-hosts: Damien Fahey, Lyndsey Rodrigues. Performers: Mary J. Blige, Kid Rock, Fabolous, Paramore, Good Charlotte, Wyclef Jean, Boys Like Girls, Flo Rida. House DJ: Travie McCoy. Guests: Cast members of A Shot at Love with Tila Tequila, Perez Hilton.
2008-2009: FNMTV Presents: A Miley-Sized Surprise...New Year's Eve 2009. Honoring: Alison Kaprielian and the Kaprielian family. Host and performer: Miley Cyrus from Beckman High School in Irvine, California. Irvine additional performer: Metro Station. Live shots and performances from Times Square hosted by The Veronicas, Adrienne Bailon, and Lil Mama. NYC performers: All Time Low, The Academy Is... and Kevin Rudolf
2009-2010: MTV News Presents: Top 9 of '09 – Host Adrienne Bailon and the cast of Jersey Shore. Guests: Cast of The Buried Life, Shailene Woodley, and Josie Loren. Produced by MTV News from the small Downtown studio portion of MTV Studios and outside in Times Square.
2010-2011: MTV New Year's Bash 2011. Host: Whitney Cummings. Guests: Cast of Jersey Shore. Pre-taped ball drop with Snooki inside from Seaside Heights. Correspondents: Kevin Manno and Julie Alexandria. Performers: Flo Rida. Guests: Ashley Benson, Shay Mitchell. Pre-taped segments from Bobby Moynihan, Nick Kroll, and Keenan Cahill.
2011-2012: MTV NYE In NYC 2012 – Hosts: Demi Lovato and Tyler Posey. Performers: Demi Lovato, Selena Gomez, Jason Derulo, Mac Miller and J. Cole.
2012-2013: MTV's Club NYE 2013 – Hosts Snooki, JWoww, Jeff Dye. Performers:  Ke$ha, Ne-Yo, Sean Kingston, Rita Ora and Conor Maynard. Guests: Tyler Blackburn, Keegan Allen, choreographer Binkie, Nikki Glaser and Sara Schaefer. House DJ: The Knocks
2013-2014: Girl Code Presents: New Year's Code—Special episode of Girl Code at 10pm ET. Hosts: live hosting in Times Square from Carly Aquilino and Charlamagne Tha God during the episode and for the hour after. Guests: Cast of Vampire Acacdemy (Zoey Deutch, Cameron Monaghan, and Dominic Sherwood).
2014-2015: MTV's New Year's Eve 2015 – Hosts Victoria Justice and Charlamagne. New filmed segments with Girl Code and Guy Code comedians.

References
Notes

American annual television specials
Music television specials
New Year's television specials
1981 American television series debuts
1990s American television series
2000s American television series
2010s American television series
New Year's
Television shows filmed in New York City